The Limerick Senior Hurling Championship (known for sponsorship reasons as the Bon Secours Hospital County Senior Hurling Championship and abbreviated to the Limerick SHC) is an annual hurling competition organised by the Limerick County Board of the Gaelic Athletic Association and contested by the top-ranking senior clubs in the county of Limerick in Ireland. It is the most prestigious competition in Limerick hurling.

The series of games are played during the summer and autumn months with the county final currently being played at the Gaelic Grounds in October. The prize for the winning team is the John Daly Cup. Initially played as a knock-out competition, the championship currently uses a round robin format followed by a knock-out stage.

The Limerick County Championship is an integral part of the wider Munster Senior Club Hurling Championship. The winners of the Limerick county final join the champions of the other four hurling counties to contest the provincial championship.

Twelve teams currently participate in the Limerick County Championship. The title has been won at least once by 29 different teams. The all-time record-holders are Patrickswell, who have won a total of 20 titles.

The current holders are Na Piarsaigh.

The championship

Overview
The Limerick County Championship features a group stage followed by a knock-out stage. Each team in the championship is guaranteed at least five games. Relegation also takes place with the Limerick Premier Intermediate Hurling Championship.

Format

Group stage
For the group stage there are two groups of six teams. In 2018 the teams have been ranked based on their recent performances. Group 1 consists of what are regarded as the "strongest" teams. All six of these teams qualified for the knock-out stage in 2017. Group 2 is the "weaker" teams.

Teams play the other five teams in the group once, and match points are awarded depending on the result of each game, with teams receiving two points for a win, and one for a draw.

Following the completion of the group stage, the top four-ranking teams in Group 1 and the top two-ranking teams in Group 2 qualify for the knock-out stage of the championship.

Knock-out stage
The two quarter-finals consist of the third and fourth-ranked teams from Group 1 and the top two-ranked teams from Group 2. The winners of the quarter-finals advance to the semi-finals where they join the top two-ranked teams from Group 1 who received a bye to this stage.

Participating teams

Sponsorship
Between 2016 and 2018 the Limerick County Championship was sponsored by the Credit Union. The championship was previously sponsored by the Limerick Motor Centre. Since 2019 the Bon Secours Hospital are the primary sponsors.

Qualification for subsequent competitions
The Limerick Senior Hurling Championship winners qualify for the subsequent Munster Senior Club Hurling Championship. This place is reserved for club teams only as divisional and amalgamated teams are not allowed in the provincial championship.

Venues

Group stage
Fixtures in the group stage of the championship are usually played at a neutral venue that is deemed halfway between the participating teams. Some of the more common venues include Fr. Hayes Memorial Park and FitzGerald Park, while the Gaelic Grounds also hosts a number of double-headers. Quarter-finals and semi-finals are also held at the Gaelic Grounds.

Final
The final has been played at the Gaelic Grounds since it opened in the late 1920s. Prior to this the Markets Field regularly hosted the county final.

Trophy
The winning team is presented with the John Daly Cup. A native of Limerick, John Daly (1845-1916) was a leading member of the Irish Republican Brotherhood. In 1928, Madge Daly who was a niece of John Daly, presented the Limerick County Board with a cup for the county senior hurling championship. The first captain to accept the cup was Bob McConkey.

Managers
Managers in the Limerick Championship are involved in the day-to-day running of the team, including the training, team selection, and sourcing of players. Their influence varies from club-to-club and is related to the individual club committees. The manager is assisted by a team of two or three selectors and a backroom team consisting of various coaches.

Finals listed by year

No championship was held in the following years: 1892, 1894, 1901, 1903, 1906, 1913, 1921, 1923.

Winners listed by club

Records and statistics

Team

By decade
The most successful team of each decade, judged by number of Limerick Senior Hurling Championship titles, is as follows:

 1880s: 2 for South Liberties (1888-89)
 1890s: 2 for Kilfinane (1897-99)
 1900s: 2 for Caherline (1905-07)
 1910s: 4 for Claughaun (1914-15-16-18)
 1920s: 3 for Young Irelands (1920-22-28)
 1930s: 8 for Ahane (1931-33-34-35-36-37-38-39)
 1940s: 7 for Ahane (1942-43-44-45-46-47-48)
 1950s: 3 each for Treaty Sarsfields (1951-52-53) and Cappamore (1954-56-59)
 1960s: 3 for Patrickswell (1965-66-69)
 1970s: 3 each for Patrickswell (1970-77-79), South Liberties (1972-76-78) and Kilmallock (1973-74-75)
 1980s: 5 for Patrickswell (1982-83-84-87-88)
 1990s: 5 for Patrickswell (1990-93-95-96-97)
 2000s: 5 for Adare (2001-02-07-08-09)
 2010s: 5 for Na Piarsaigh (2011-13-15-17-18)
2020s: 2 for Kilmallock (2020-21)

Gaps

Top ten longest gaps between successive championship titles:

 113 years: Bruree (1893-2006)
 82 years: South Liberties (1890-1972)
 50 years: Cappamore (1904-1954)
 43 years: Ahane (1955-1998)
 31 years: Claughaun (1926-1957)
 16 years: Kilmallock (1994-2010)
 15 years: Claughaun (1971-1986)
 13 years: Patrickswell (2003-2016)
 11 years: Croom (1908-1919)
 11 years: Croom (1929-1940)

Top scorers

Finals

See also

 Limerick Premier Intermediate Hurling Championship

References

External links
Official Limerick website
Limerick on Hoganstand
Limerick Club GAA

 
1
Senior hurling county championships